The Phalène ("moth[-eared]") is a toy dog breed, the drop eared variety of the Papillon ("butterfly[-eared]") dog. Both varieties can occur in the same litter.

Appearance and behavior 

The Phalène is  an intelligent  dog. They learn new tricks easily. They are sociable with the family but reserved around new people.  They need to be socialized to get along well with other pets or they can be distrustful and exhibit aggressive tendencies toward other dogs and people. Phalènes are  playful and affectionate. They are  lap dogs and  companion dogs. They have enough energy to keep up with active families, but can also be calm enough to  live in an apartment. Due to their rather high  energy level, they demand regular exercise routine,  as other companion breeds. Papillons are known as good  watchdogs and they will alert their owner to changes in their environment. They can be noisy like many other toy dogs. The Papillon can withstand heat but is more sensitive to cold temperatures because of their single-coated fur, and should not be left outside unattended in cold weather.

History

The Phalène is the earliest form of the Papillon; the appearance of the erect-eared variety was not documented until the 16th century. Belgium, France, Spain, and Italy have all been credited with the creation or development of Butterfly Dogs. The Papillon gained popularity after the turn of the nineteenth century. By the middle of the 20th century, the Papillon's popularity had far outstripped that of the Phalène, which sank low enough into obscurity to become endangered.  The breed had fanciers and did not slip into extinction.  At some point the variety was named phalène, or ‘night moth’.

The 21st century has seen a revival of interest in the Phalène, with its fanciers pointing out that in countries where it is judged together with the Papillon, judges must be familiar enough with the breed standard to appreciate the qualities of a well-bred Phalène, and not confuse its dropped ears with those of a semi-erect eared Papillon, which would suggest a conformation fault.

American Kennel Club
The Phalène is considered a variant of the Papillon in the AKC, where they are registered as Papillons and shown and judged in the same classes.  The breed standard is the same with the exception of the dropped ear, which does not sit as low on the head as that of other spaniel types.  In nations where clubs follow the guidelines of the FCI, the Phalène is considered a separate breed.

See also
 Dogs portal
 List of dog breeds

References

External links

FCI breeds
Companion dogs
Dog breeds originating in France
Dog breeds originating in Belgium